1991 ACC tournament may refer to:

 1991 ACC men's basketball tournament
 1991 ACC women's basketball tournament
 1991 ACC men's soccer tournament
 1991 ACC women's soccer tournament
 1991 Atlantic Coast Conference baseball tournament